Pakuba Airfield  is an airfield serving Pakuba and Murchison Falls National Park in the Nwoya District of northern Uganda.

The airport is operated by the Civil Aviation Authority of Uganda. It is one of the five upcountry airports that are authorized to handle cross-border air traffic from member countries of the East African Community, as part of efforts to promote tourism within eastern Africa. Pakuba Airfield receives daily domestic flights from Entebbe International Airport and Kajjansi Airfield, which are primarily used by tourists to visit Murchison Falls National Park, as well as connecting to Kidepo Valley National Park and Queen Elizabeth National Park.

Location

Cartographic misdesignation

On a considerable number of cartographic materials (including Wikimapia, Google Maps, and others) Pakuba Airfield is incorrectly denoted as "Kabalega Falls Airport". "Kabalega Falls" is a now-disused designation for "Murchison Falls."

Airlines and destinations

See also

 List of airports in Uganda
 Transport in Uganda

References

External links

 Uganda Civil Aviation Authority
 
 Pakuba Airfield on OpenStreetMap

Airports in Uganda
Nwoya District